Michelsberg or Michaelsberg may refer to:

Hills and mountains in Germany
 Michelsberg (Albtrauf), part of the Albtrauf escarpment in the Swabian Alps, Germany
 Michelsberg (Eifel), a hill in Bad Münstereifel, Euskirchen, North Rhine-Westphalia, Germany
 Michelsberg (Kelheim), a hill in the town of Kelheim, Bavaria, Germany
 Michaelsberg (Untergrombach) (Michelsberg), a hill at Untergrombach near Bruchsal in Baden-Württemberg, Germany
 A hill in Bad Überkingen), Göppingen, Baden-Württemberg, Germany
 A hill near Münnerstadt, Bad Kissingen, Bavaria, Germany
 A hill in Fläming Heath, Wittenberg district, Saxony-Anhalt, Germany

Settlements
 , a village in Nittenau, Schwandorf, Germany
 A village in Schwalmstadt, North Hesse, Germany
 A quarter of Ulm in Baden-Württemberg, Germany; see Ulm campaign
 A village in Bad Überkingen), Göppingen, Baden-Württemberg, Germany
 Myjomice, a village in Gmina Kępno, Greater Poland Voivodeship, Poland
 Cisnădioara , a village in Sibiu, Romania

Other uses
 Michelsberg (Großlage), a wine region in Bernkastel, Mosel
 Michelsberg Abbey, Bamberg, Bavaria, Germany
 Michelsberg culture, a New Stone Age culture in Central Europe
 Frutolf of Michelsberg (died 1103), monk and prior at Michelsberg Abbey, Bamberg, Germany
 Ouvrage Michelsberg, an artillery bunker on the Maginot Line in France

See also
 Michaelsberg (disambiguation)